Hell Gate National Forest was established as the Hell Gate Forest Reserve by the U.S. Forest Service in Montana on October 3, 1905 with .  It became a National Forest on March 4, 1907. On July 1, 1908 the entire forest was divided between Beaverhead, Deerlodge, Missoula and Bitterroot National Forests and the name was discontinued.

See also
 List of forests in Montana

References

External links
Forest History Society
Listing of the National Forests of the United States and Their Dates (from the Forest History Society website) Text from Davis, Richard C., ed. Encyclopedia of American Forest and Conservation History. New York: Macmillan Publishing Company for the Forest History Society, 1983. Vol. II, pp. 743-788.

Former National Forests of Montana
1905 establishments in Montana